Gerontia may refer to:
Gerontia (gastropod) Hutton, 1882, a genus of snails in the family Charopidae
Gerontia (moth) Schaus, 1904, a genus of moths in the family Megalopygidae
Gerontia (island), an island of Greece